Ma Faying (born 30 August 1993) is a Chinese racewalking athlete. Representing China at the 2019 World Athletics Championships, she placed fifth in the women's 50 kilometres walk.

References

Chinese female racewalkers
1993 births
Living people
World Athletics Championships athletes for China